This is a list of members of the fifth legislature of the Northern Cape. The term started on 21 May 2014 and ended on 7 May 2019.

References

External links
Archived webpage

Legislature